Mario Marín Soto (born 4 April 1991) is a Spanish footballer who plays for CD Plus Ultra as a right back.

Club career
Born in Murcia, Marín was a product of Real Murcia's youth system. He made his professional debut on 20 June 2009, appearing in a 1–2 away loss against Córdoba CF in the Segunda División. In January 2010, he signed a three-and-a-half-year professional contract with his hometown club.

In the 2010–11 season, Marín contributed with 11 games as Murcia returned to the second level after one year, as champions. He continued to be sparingly played in the following two campaigns.

On 1 August 2013, Marín signed with Valencia CF Mestalla of the Segunda División B. On 30 July of the following year he moved to another reserve team, Atlético Madrid B also in the third level.

On 18 July 2015, Marín agreed to a three-year deal with Recreativo de Huelva, recently relegated to the third tier.

References

External links

1991 births
Living people
Footballers from Murcia
Spanish footballers
Association football defenders
Segunda División players
Segunda División B players
Real Murcia Imperial players
Real Murcia players
Valencia CF Mestalla footballers
Atlético Madrid B players
Recreativo de Huelva players
FC Jumilla players